Mukarram Hussain Khundkar ( – 30 November 1972) was a Bangladeshi scientist and educationist. He served as a professor at the Department of Chemistry of University of Dhaka. He was one of the founding fellows of Bangladesh Academy of Sciences.

Education
Khundkar passed the matriculation examination from Barisal Zilla School and intermediate from Jagannath College. He completed his bachelor's and master's degrees in chemistry from the University of Dhaka. He earned his Ph.D. in chemistry from the University of Durham.

Career
Khundkar joined the department as a Reader in chemistry in 1949. He became a professor in 1960. His contributions to various fields of chemistry included modification of cellulose and jute, electrochemistry, metal sulphides, non-metallic sulphur compounds, inorganic borates, organo-boron compounds, mineral processing, and analytical chemistry.

Khundkar was a Fellow of the Royal Society of Chemistry (FRIC) of Great Britain and Royal Society of Arts (FRSA), London.

Khundkar was a member of the sub-committee for Science and Technology of the Bangla Academy and chairman of the Paribhasa Committee for Chemistry of the Central Board for the development of Bengali.

Awards
 Pakistan Academy of Sciences Gold Medal for research in the Physical Sciences
 University Gold Medal of Dhaka University
 Independence Day Award (1977)

Legacy
University of Dhaka holds a memorial lecture every year named as Khundkar Memorial Lecture in Khundker's memory. A science building of the university is named as Mukarram Hussain Biggyan Bhaban. One of the main buildings of the Bangladesh Council of Scientific and Industrial Research (BCSIR) is named as Khundkar Smriti Bhaban. The university also hosts a research chair in memory of him.

References

1920s births
1972 deaths
People from Faridpur District
University of Dhaka alumni
Academic staff of the University of Dhaka
Alumni of Durham University
Fellows of Bangladesh Academy of Sciences
Fellows of Pakistan Academy of Sciences
Fellows of the Royal Institute of Chemistry
Recipients of the Independence Day Award